The term Ultra C is a cultural idiom in Japan that started as the informal strategy used by the Japanese Olympic gymnastics team in 1968.  In the 1968 Summer Olympics, gymnastic feats were assigned a difficulty rating A-C, with A being easier than C. Since then, the difficulty ratings have expanded to A-G. At the time, the Japanese team used the term "ultra-C" to describe their strategy, as a metaphor for their goal to perform on a level beyond the best score, or to give "110%". This strategy ultimately brought them the gold medal that year, and the term stuck so well it entered the Japanese lexicon.

"Ultra C" has also expanded into Figure skating referring to ladies competing with a triple axel or any quadruple jump, however this is not officially recognized in figure skating lexicon.

Cultural references

Dictionary definition
ウルトラＣ (Noun) 1. amazing feat; trump card; (something) earth-shattering. Colloquialism, Wasei, originated in Japan, during the 1968 Summer Olympics. From English “ultra C”,  C level having been the highest degree of difficulty in artistic gymnastics when the term was coined.

Other
This phrase became the basis for many marketing campaigns, and even lent to the title of the show Ultra Q, and its sequel Ultraman. 

http://ajw.asahi.com/article/views/vox/AJ201208030039

Japanese words and phrases
Gymnastics in Japan